The 2023 Victoria's Voice Foundation 200 was the 2nd stock car race of the 2023 NASCAR Craftsman Truck Series, and the 6th iteration of the event. The race was held on Friday, March 3, 2023, in North Las Vegas, Nevada at Las Vegas Motor Speedway, a  permanent tri-oval shaped racetrack. The race was contested over 134 laps. Kyle Busch, driving for his own team, Kyle Busch Motorsports, would put on a dominating performance, leading 84 laps for his 63rd NASCAR Craftsman Truck Series win, and his first of the season. To fill out the podium, Zane Smith, driving for Front Row Motorsports, and Ben Rhodes, driving for ThorSport Racing, would finish 2nd and 3rd, respectively.

Background 
Las Vegas Motor Speedway, located in Clark County, Nevada outside the Las Vegas city limits and about 15 miles northeast of the Las Vegas Strip, is a  complex of multiple tracks for motorsports racing. The complex is owned by Speedway Motorsports, Inc., which is headquartered in Charlotte, North Carolina.

Entry list 

 (R) denotes rookie driver.
 (i) denotes driver who is ineligible for series driver points.

Practice 
The first and only practice session was held on Friday, March 3, at 1:30 PM PST, and last for 20 minutes.

Qualifying 
Qualifying was held on Friday, March 3, at 2:00 PM PST. Since Las Vegas Motor Speedway is an intermediate racetrack, the qualifying system used is a single-car, single-lap system with only one round. In that round, whoever sets the fastest time will win the pole.

Race results 
Stage 1 Laps: 30

Stage 2 Laps: 30

Stage 3 Laps: 74

Standings after the race 

Drivers' Championship standings

Note: Only the first 10 positions are included for the driver standings.

References 

NASCAR races at Las Vegas Motor Speedway
Victoria's Voice Foundation 200
Victoria's Voice Foundation 200